B. F. Terry High School is located in Rosenberg, Texas, United States, and is part of the Lamar Consolidated Independent School District.

Terry serves all of Beasley, and serves parts of Rosenberg, and the unincorporated communities of Booth and Crabb. It formerly served most of Pleak.

It is named after Benjamin Franklin Terry, the leader of the 8th Texas Cavalry of the Confederate Army, also known as Terry's Texas Rangers.

Feeder schools

Secondary schools 
George Junior High School
Navarro Middle School

Elementary schools 

Travis Elementary School
Meyer Elementary School
Bowie Elementary School
Beasley Elementary School
Manford Williams Elementary School
Taylor Ray Elementary School
 Thomas Elementary School

Travis, Meyer, Bowie, and Taylor Ray elementary schools are entirely zoned to B.F. Terry High School.

References

External links

 

Lamar Consolidated Independent School District high schools
Rosenberg, Texas